The Illogical Consequence is the second album released by Planet Funk.

Track listing

Notes
Vocals on tracks 1, 2, 3, 5, 6, 7, 8, 9  by John Graham.
Vocals on tracks 4, 11, 13 by Dan Black.
Vocals on track 10 by Claudia Pandolfi.
Vocals on track 12 by Sally Doherty.
Track 9 contains excerpts from an interview with Julius Robert Oppenheimer during the 1965 NBC television documentary The Decision to Drop the Bomb.

Personnel 

 Marco Baroni - Keyboards, synthesizers, piano, samples, programming, arrangements, production
 Alex Neri - Synthesizers, samples, disk jockey, programming, arrangements, production 
 Sergio Della Monica - Bass, guitar, arrangements, production
 Domenico "GG" Canu - Guitar, production

Additional musicians 

 John Graham - Vocals, guitar (track 2), piano (track 6), additional keyboards (tracks 3,8,9)
 Dan Black - Vocals
 Sally Doherty - Vocals
 Claudia Pandolfi - Vocals
 Simon Duffy - Keyboards, drum programming, engineering, mixing
 Leonardo Martera - Drums
 Andrea Cozzani - Bass (tracks 2,4,7,8)
 Cecilia Chailly - Harp
 John Miller - Drums (track 12)
 Maurizio Fiordaliso - Acoustic guitar (track 6)

Charts

References

2005 albums
Planet Funk albums